Mark Offerdahl (born 15 October 1987) is a United States international rugby league footballer who plays for and coaches his hometown club the Goondiwindi Boars in Australia. He was a member of the USA squad for both the 2013 and 2017 World Cups. He has previously played for AS Carcassonne, in France, North Wales Crusaders, in Wales, and London Broncos, Oxford and Sheffield Eagles, in England. 

Offerdahl is known as 'Captain America' because of his position as captain of the USA International team.

Background
Offerdahl was born in Goondiwindi, Queensland, Australia, and is of American descent through his father, a native of Madison, Wisconsin who served in the United States Army.

Playing career

Early career
Offerdahl played his junior rugby league for Goondiwindi in the Toowoomba Rugby League. He played for the Manly Sea Eagles at a junior level, and also spent time with the Easts Tigers in the Queensland Cup, AS Carcassonne in the French Elite One Championship, and the Connecticut Wildcats in the AMNRL.

Club career
Following the 2013 World Cup, Offerdahl signed with the recently promoted Championship side North Wales Crusaders. He left the club mid-season to join the Illawarra Cutters in the New South Wales Cup.

On 11 August 2014, Offerdahl signed with the Bradford Bulls in the Championship for the 2015 season, but did not join the club due to recurring injuries.

Offerdahl signed a two-year contract with London Broncos in the Championship on 23 July 2015. The front-rower made nearly 40 appearances for the Broncos and scored 5 tries in his two years with the club. During his time in London, Offerdahl was sent on loan to Oxford, Here, he played in just one game; a 32-12 win against Hemel Stags.

On finishing his two-year contract with Broncos, Offerdahl signed a one-year deal with fellow Championship outfit the Sheffield Eagles. He became their eighth permanent signing and first of 2018, ahead of the upcoming season. 

Having played nearly 30 games that season, Offerdahl returned home to play for and coach the Goondiwindi Boars in the TRL.

International career
In October 2011, Offerdahl was selected to represent the United States in their 2013 World Cup qualifying matches against South Africa and Jamaica, scoring a try against Jamaica.

In 2013, Offerdahl was named in the US squad for the 2013 World Cup. He played in their three group matches against the Cook Islands, Wales and Scotland, along with their semi-final against Australia. He scored a try against the Cook Islands.

In December 2015, Offerdahl captained the United States in their 2017 World Cup qualifying matches against Jamaica and Canada, scoring a try against Jamaica.

On 24 September 2017, Offerdahl was named in the United States' squad for the 2017 World Cup. He was named captain of the side and played in all of their games (against Fiji, Italy and PNG). Mark continues to be an advocate for growing the game in the States.

Coaching career
As well as being co-owner, Mark took over head coach/player responsibilities for New York Freedom for their inaugural 2021 season in the new North American Rugby League

Off the field

Offerdahl's passion for health and fitness extends from the football field and his own training to helping others and owns FWD.Fit, functional training gyms in Hawthorne and Katonah, New York. Mark married his wife Jenna in London in 2017. Offerdahl adopted a son in 2019 and currently still looks after his adult son, Philip Schacter.

References

External links
Sheffield Eagles profile
London Broncos profile

Easts Tigers profile
2017 RLWC profile

1987 births
Living people
AS Carcassonne players
Australian expatriate sportspeople in England
Australian expatriate sportspeople in Wales
Australian people of American descent
Australian rugby league players
Connecticut Wildcats rugby league players
Eastern Suburbs Tigers players
London Broncos players
New York Freedom Rugby League coaches
New York Freedom Rugby League players
North Wales Crusaders players
Oxford Rugby League players
Rugby league players from Queensland
Rugby league props
Rugby league second-rows
Sheffield Eagles players
United States national rugby league team captains
United States national rugby league team players
People from Goondiwindi